Fielder is a surname, and may refer to:
 Albert Fielder (1889–1947), English cricketer
 Alvin Fielder (1935–2019), American jazz drummer
 Angie Fielder, Australian film producer
 Arthur Fielder (1877–1949), English cricket fast bowler
 Aubrey Fielder (1929–2005), British cross-country skier
 Bruce Fielder (born 1992), English DJ, record producer, and remixer
 Cecil Fielder (born 1963), former professional baseball player
 Colin Fielder (born 1964), English footballer
 George Bragg Fielder (1842–1906), former congressman from New Jersey
 Goodman Fielder, food product distributor in Australia and New Zealand
 Guyle Fielder (born 1930), former professional ice hockey player
 Harry Fielder (born 1940), English actor
 James Fairman Fielder (1867–1954), former Democratic governor of New Jersey
 Jennifer Fielder, politician
 Jim Fielder (born 1947), former bassist for Blood, Sweat, and Tears
 John Fielder (born 1950), American landscape photographer and nature writer
 Joyce Fielder (born 1938), table tennis player from England
 Kendall J. Fielder (1893–1981), officer in the United States Army
 Mary Beth Fielder, American filmmaker
 Nathan Fielder (born 1983), Canadian writer, comedian, and film maker
 Pat Fielder (1929–2018), American screenwriter
 Prince Fielder (born 1984), major league baseball player
 Richard Fielder (1925–2020), American screenwriter
 Richard Fielder (1758–1826), English professional cricketer
 Ross Fielder (1926–1995), Australian rugby league footballer
 Walter Fielder (1899–1968), English cricketer

See also 
 Fielder (disambiguation)